The Sunflower Square (Portuguese: Praça dos Girassóis) is the main public square in the Brazilian city of Palmas, the capital of the state of Tocantins. It was inaugurated in 1991 and holds the Araguaia Palace, the seat of Tocantins' government. It is also one of the largest squares in the world.

References

Palmas, Tocantins
Squares in Brazil